Gwyn Alfred "Alf" Williams (30 September 1925 – 16 November 1995) was a Welsh historian particularly known for his work on Antonio Gramsci and Francisco Goya as well as on Welsh history.

Life 
Williams was born in the iron town of Dowlais situated above the industrial town of Merthyr Tydfil. He attended the Cyfarthfa Grammar School and later read history at University College Wales, Aberystwyth. During World War II, he joined the British Army and fought in Normandy. Williams received his doctorate for a dissertation later published as Medieval London: from commune to capital. Gwyn was also a committed Marxist however he became disillusioned with the Russian system following the atrocities committed by Stalin. He was the first historian to publish an article in English on Antonio Gramsci.

Career
In 1954, Williams was appointed Lecturer in Welsh History at Aberystwyth University where he worked with another historian of Wales David Williams. He left Aberystwyth for the University of York where he was Chair of History from 1965 to 1974.  He moved back to Wales in 1974, becoming Professor of History at University College Cardiff, where he stayed until his retirement in 1983.  Throughout his career, Williams was known as an exciting lecturer, capable of drawing large crowds from across the university. After his retirement, he continued to write, but he focused more and more on television and film, presenting, with Wynford Vaughan-Thomas, a 13-part series in 1985 by HTV and Channel 4 on Welsh history entitled The Dragon Has Two Tongues.

Williams was also a supporter of Republicanism; and later a member of Plaid Cymru, he praised the anti-monarchy book The Enchanted Glass by Tom Nairn. In 1983 Williams took early retirement from his chair at Cardiff  and began making films with Teliesyn, an  independent Welsh broadcasting company based in Cardiff. He eventually moved from Cardiff to the village of Dre-fach Felindre, in Carmarthenshire.

Publications
Medieval London, 1963 [2nd edition 2007]
Artisans and Sans-Culottes: Popular Movements in France and Britain During the French Revolution, 1968 [2nd edition 2001]
Proletarian Order: Antonio Gramsci, Factory Councils and the Origins of Communism in Italy 1911-1921, 1975
Goya and the Impossible Revolution, 1976
The Merthyr Rising, 1978 [2nd edition 1998; reprinted 2013, 2021]
Madoc: The Making of a Myth, 1979
The Search for Beulah Land: the Welsh and the Atlantic Revolution, 1980
The Welsh in Their History, 1982
When Was Wales?, 1985
Excalibur: the Search for Arthur, 1994

References

1925 births
1995 deaths
20th-century Welsh historians
Historians of Wales
People educated at Cyfarthfa Grammar School
Alumni of Aberystwyth University
Academics of Aberystwyth University
Academics of Cardiff University
Academics of the University of York
People from Dowlais
Welsh television presenters
Welsh nationalists
Welsh republicans